The 1992–93 NBA season was the Bullets' 32nd season in the National Basketball Association. In the 1992 NBA draft, the Bullets selected Tom Gugliotta out of North Carolina State with the sixth pick. In the off-season, the team acquired rookie forward Don MacLean from the Los Angeles Clippers, who had acquired him from the Detroit Pistons, and signed free agents Buck Johnson, and rookie guard Doug Overton. However, Ledell Eackles would miss the entire season due to weight problems. The Bullets got off to a 7–10 start to the season, but then struggled posting a nine-game losing streak in December, and held a 15–36 record at the All-Star break. In January, All-Star forward Bernard King was released to free agency, and later on signed as a free agent with the New Jersey Nets. The team struggled with injuries as Pervis Ellison only played just 49 games due to a knee injury, Rex Chapman only played 60 games due to an ankle injury, and Overton only played just 45 games due to a thumb injury. The Bullets lost ten of their final eleven games, finishing last place in the Atlantic Division with a 22–60 record.

Despite their struggles, Harvey Grant led the team in scoring averaging 18.6 points per game, while Michael Adams averaged 14.8 points, 7.5 assists and 1.4 steals per game, and Gugliotta provided the team with 14.7 points, 9.6 rebounds and 1.7 steals per game, and was named to the NBA All-Rookie First Team. In addition, Ellison averaged 17.4 points, 8.8 rebounds and 2.2 blocks per game, while Chapman contributed 12.5 points per game, second-year forward Larry Stewart provided with 9.8 points and 4.7 rebounds per game, and second-year guard LaBradford Smith contributed 9.3 points per game. Following the season, Grant was traded to the Portland Trail Blazers, and Johnson, Eackles and Charles Jones were all released to free agency.

One notable highlight of the season was Smith scoring a career-high of 37 points against Michael Jordan, and the Chicago Bulls at the Chicago Stadium on March 19, 1993. Smith shot 15–20 from the field, while Jordan struggled shooting just 9–27 from the field. However, the Bullets lost to the Bulls, 104–99.

NBA Draft

Roster

Roster Notes
 Shooting guard Ledell Eackles missed the entire season due to weight problems.

Regular season

Season standings

y - clinched division title
x - clinched playoff spot

z - clinched division title
y - clinched division title
x - clinched playoff spot

Record vs. opponents

Game log

Player statistics

NOTE: Please write the players statistics in alphabetical order by last name.

Awards and Records
 Tom Gugliotta, NBA All-Rookie Team 1st Team

Transactions

See also
 1992–93 NBA season

References

Washington Wizards seasons
Wash
Wiz
Wiz